The Laugh Resort was a stand-up comedy club in Toronto, Ontario, Canada. For several years it was the only competition to the Yuk-Yuks chain in downtown Toronto. Visiting comedians frequently played at the club, and it became a home of Canada's independent and more alternative comics.

The club moved from its location next to The Second City's historic Old Fire Hall to a central downtown location in the basement of the Holiday Inn on King Street in 2000, and closed in 2008 when the hotel chain was sold and the basement space was needed to build a new luxury restaurant.

According to the club's website they are still looking for a new location.

Guest comedians include
Brent Butt
Charlie Currie
Ellen DeGeneres
Dave Foley
Mitch Hedberg
Ron James
Al Lubel
Russell Peters
Paula Poundstone
Ray Romano
Adam Sandler
Margaret Smith
David Spade
Ron Sparks

Comedy clubs in Canada
Performing arts in Toronto